Elections to Liverpool City Council were held on 1 November 1930.

After the election, the composition of the council was:

Election result

Ward results

* - Councillor seeking re-election

Comparisons are made with the 1927 election results.

Abercromby

Aigburth

Allerton

Anfield

Breckfield

Brunswick

Castle Street

Childwall

Croxteth

This was a new ward from 1928, so no councillor was elected in 1927.

Dingle

Edge Hill

Everton

Exchange

Fairfield

Fazakerley

Garston

Granby

Great George

Kensington

Kirkdale

Low Hill

Much Woolton

Netherfield

North Scotland

Old Swan

Prince's Park

Sandhills

St. Anne's

St. Domingo

St. Peter's

Sefton Park East

Sefton Park West

South Scotland

Vauxhall

Walton

Warbreck

Wavertree

Wavertree West

West Derby

Aldermanic elections

Aldermanic election 10 November 1930

The term of office of Alderman Henry Morley Miller (Conservative, elected as an alderman on 10 November 1924) expired on 10 November 1930 and 
he was re-elected for a further 5-year term by the Councillors on that date.

Aldermanic Election 7 January 1931

Following the death of Alderman Thomas Wafer Byrne (Labour, elected as an alderman on 9 November 1929), Councillor Herbert Edward Rose (Labour, Breckfield, elected on 1 November 1929) was elected by the councillors as an alderman on 7 January 1931.

Aldermanic Election 1 April 1931

Following the death on 17 December 1930 of Alderman John Gordon J.P. (Conservative, last elected as an alderman on 9 November 1929), Councillor Frank Campbell Wilson J.P. (Conservative, Aigburth, elected 1 November 1929) was elected as an alderman by the councillors on 1 April 1931

Aldermanic Election 6 May 1931

Following the death on 24 December 1930 of Alderman John George Moyles M.B.E. J.P. (Conservative, last elected as an alderman on 9 November 1929), Councillor Herbert John Davis (Conservative, Allerton, elected 1 November 1929) was elected as an alderman by the councillors on 6 May 1931.

Aldermanic Election 7 October 1931

Following the resignation of Alderman Richard Rutherford (Conservative, last elected as an alderman on 9 November 1929), which was reported to the Council on 2 September 1931, Councillor Sir Thomas White (Conservative Party, St. Domingo, elected 1 November 1928) was elected as an alderman by the councillors on 7 October 1931.

By-elections

No. 30 Breckfield, 24 March 1931

Following the death of Alderman Thomas Wafer Byrne, Councillor Herbert Edward Rose (Labour, Breckfield, elected on 1 November 1929) was elected by the councillors as an alderman on 7 January 1931, causing a vacancy in the Breckfield ward.

No. 17 Aigburth, 20 May 1931

Following the death on 17 December 1930 of Alderman John Gordon J.P. (Conservative, last elected as an alderman on 9 November 1929), Councillor Frank Campbell Wilson J.P. (Conservative, Aigburth, elected 1 November 1929) was elected as an alderman by the councillors on 1 April 1931, causing a vacancy in the Aigburth ward.

No. 35 Allerton, 6 October 1931

Following the death on 24 December 1930 of Alderman John George Moyles M.B.E. J.P. (Conservative, last elected as an alderman on 9 November 1929), Councillor Herbert John Davis (Conservative, Allerton, elected 1 November 1929) was elected as an alderman by the councillors on 6 May 1931, causing a vacancy in the Allerton ward.

No. 13 Prince's Park, Thursday 23 July 1931

Caused by the death on 22 February 1931 of Councillor Miss Margaret Beavan (Conservative, Prince's Park, last elected 1 November 1930).

No. 23 St. Domingo

Following the resignation of Alderman Richard Rutherford (Conservative, last elected as an alderman on 9 November 1929), which was reported to the Council on 2 September 1931, Councillor Sir Thomas White (Conservative Party, St. Domingo, elected 1 November 1928) was elected as an alderman by the councillors on 7 October 1931, thereby causing a vacancy in the St. Domingo ward.

No. 4 Vauxhall

Caused by the resignation of Councillor Dr. Percy Henry Hayes (Labour, Vauxhall, last elected on 1 November 1929), which was reported to the Council on 21 October 1931.

See also

 Liverpool City Council
 Liverpool Town Council elections 1835 - 1879
 Liverpool City Council elections 1880–present
 Mayors and Lord Mayors of Liverpool 1207 to present
 History of local government in England

References

1930
1930 English local elections
1930s in Liverpool